Captain Sir Charles MacMahon (10 July 1824 – 28 August 1891) was an Australian politician who twice served as Speaker of the Victorian Legislative Assembly and as Chief Commissioner of Victoria Police. MacMahon was born County Tyrone, Ireland, to a wealthy Irish family and served in the British army. He obtained a veterinary diploma in 1852, and soon left for Australia to join the gold rush.  He arrived in Melbourne on 18 November 1852.

Life
On 25 November 1853, MacMahon was appointed Assistant Commissioner of Police by William Henry Fancourt Mitchell and a member of the Victorian Legislative Council. When Mitchell went to England in 1854–55, MacMahon became the acting Chief Commissioner of Victoria Police. He was Chief Commissioner from 1856 to 1858 when he resigned, owing to a disagreement on a matter of discipline with the then Chief Secretary, Sir John O'Shanassy.

MacMahon had been a member of the Executive and Legislative Councils in 1853–56.  
From August 1861 to August 1864 he represented West Bourke in the Victorian Legislative Assembly, and was minister without portfolio in the O'Shanassy ministry till June 1863. From February 1866 to around February 1878 he represented West Melbourne and was Speaker of the Assembly between April 1871 and April 1877. On 29 September 1875 he was appointed a Knight Bachelor by letters patent for his services as Speaker of the Legislative Assembly.

The elections of May 1877 brought in a new Berry ministry and change of Speakers. MacMahon again represented West Melbourne in the assembly from 1880 to 1886 and was Speaker again from 11 May to 29 June 1880. He retired from politics in 1886 and died in East Melbourne, Victoria, Australia.

Charles was the son of the Right Honorable William MacMahon, an Irish judge, and his second wife Charlotte née Shaw. Charles MacMahon was twice married; first, to Sophie Campbell, sister of a Canadian barrister who became a magistrate at Beechworth, Victoria; and second, to Clara Ann, daughter of C. J. Webster of Yea. He had no children.

References

Charles MacMahon, Australian Dictionary of Biography, Volume 5, MUP, 1974.

1824 births
1891 deaths
19th-century Irish people
Politicians from County Tyrone
Chief Commissioners of Victoria Police
Victoria (Australia) state politicians
Irish expatriates in Australia
Members of the Victorian Legislative Council
Members of the Victorian Legislative Assembly
19th-century Australian politicians